Cysteine-rich protein 2 is a protein that in humans is encoded by the CRIP2 gene.

CRIP2 and the closely related CRIP1 are cysteine-rich proteins containing two LIM domains. They are highly expressed during cardiovascular development and act to bridge serum response factor and GATA proteins and stimulate smooth muscle target genes.

References

External links

Further reading